Gareth Newman is a Welsh rugby referee.

Career

Newman has been refereeing in the Welsh Premier Division for over 5 years. He has also been an assistant referee and TMO in both the United Rugby Championship and Six Nations, being named as TMO for the match between England and France during the 2021 Six Nations Championship.

References

Living people
Welsh rugby union referees
United Rugby Championship referees
Year of birth missing (living people)